Greenfield is a town in Hillsborough County, New Hampshire, United States. The population was 1,716 at the 2020 census. Greenfield is home to the Crotched Mountain Rehabilitation Center, to Greenfield State Park, and to part of the Wapack Trail.

History 

Originally known as "Lyndeborough Addition", the area was first settled by the Lynde family in 1753. Separated from the nearest church and school by the Monadnock hills, the residents successfully petitioned to form a new town in 1791, using the name "Greenfield" to highlight the area's level, fertile ground.

In 1953, the Crotched Mountain Rehabilitation Center began operation in Greenfield. Established by Harry Gregg, the facility on Crotched Mountain originally treated for polio, cerebral palsy, spina bifida and other physical and neurological disabilities. A center for adult rehabilitation opened in 1961, and a rehabilitation center for adults with brain injuries in 1986. The complex today provides service to over 2,000 children and adults. In 2004, it unveiled the first wheelchair-accessible tree house in New Hampshire.

Greenfield is home to the Yankee Siege, considered the most powerful (current) trebuchet in the world, which has participated in the annual World Championship Punkin' Chunkin' Contest in Sussex County, Delaware, since 2004.

Geography 
The southeast part of Greenfield is drained by Stony Brook, flowing southeast to the Souhegan River in Wilton, while the western part, including the town center, is drained by the Contoocook River and its tributary Otter Brook; the Contoocook forms the northwest border of the town, where it passes through Powder Mill Pond. The northeast corner of the town is drained by Rand Brook, a tributary of the South Branch of the Piscataquog River. Greenfield lies fully within the Merrimack River watershed.

Adjacent municipalities 
 Bennington, New Hampshire (north)
 Francestown, New Hampshire (northeast)
 Lyndeborough, New Hampshire (east)
 Temple, New Hampshire (south)
 Peterborough, New Hampshire (southwest)
 Hancock, New Hampshire (west)

Demographics 

As of the census of 2000, there were 1,657 people, 563 households, and 405 families residing in the town.  The population density was 65.1 people per square mile (25.1/km2).  There were 640 housing units at an average density of 25.1 per square mile (9.7/km2).  The racial makeup of the town was 97.28% White, 0.72% African American, 0.84% Native American, 0.24% Asian, 0.48% from other races, and 0.42% from two or more races. Hispanic or Latino of any race were 0.60% of the population.

There were 563 households, out of which 38.9% had children under the age of 18 living with them, 60.0% were married couples living together, 8.0% had a female householder with no husband present, and 27.9% were non-families. 19.5% of all households were made up of individuals, and 4.3% had someone living alone who was 65 years of age or older.  The average household size was 2.69 and the average family size was 3.12.

In the town, the population was spread out, with 30.8% under the age of 18, 7.3% from 18 to 24, 32.1% from 25 to 44, 22.8% from 45 to 64, and 7.1% who were 65 years of age or older.  The median age was 34 years. For every 100 females, there were 104.1 males.  For every 100 females age 18 and over, there were 105.9 males.

The median income for a household in the town was $48,833, and the median income for a family was $56,250. Males had a median income of $36,250 versus $24,438 for females. The per capita income for the town was $19,895.  About 2.4% of families and 5.4% of the population were below the poverty line, including 6.9% of those under age 18 and 8.5% of those age 65 or over.

References

External links 

 
 New Hampshire Economic and Labor Market Information Bureau Profile

 
Towns in Hillsborough County, New Hampshire
Towns in New Hampshire